Pietrangeli is an Italian surname. Notable people with the surname include:

 Anke Pietrangeli (born 1982), South African singer
 Antonio Pietrangeli (1919–1968), Italian film director and screenwriter
 Nicola "Nicky" Pietrangeli (born 1933), former Italian tennis player
 Paolo Pietrangeli (born 1945), Italian film director and screenwriter

Italian-language surnames
it:Pietrangeli